Red Cow can refer to:

Red heifer, the sacred cow in Judaism
Red Cow interchange, an infamous junction located in Dublin, also known as the Mad Cow Roundabout
Polish Red cattle
Akabeko
 Red Cow (film), a 2018 Israeli independent drama film

See also
 Red Bull (disambiguation)